Archana 31 Not Out is a 2022 Indian Malayalam-language comedy-drama film written and directed by Akhil Anilkumar, and produced by Martin Prakkat, Siby Chavara and Renjith Nair. The film stars Aishwarya Lekshmi, alongside Hakkim Shajahan, Dileep Mohan, Indrans and Ramesh Pisharody.

The plot revolves around the wedding of a 28 year old school teacher named Archana, to an NRI groom takes unexpected twists. It was released on 11 February 2022 to mostly mixed reviews.

Premise

Archana is a private school teacher. She goes through a tough phase as she is 28 and not married yet, also she is losing her job because of a management decision.
30 suitors have rejected Archana and 31st suitor is a NRI guy Prasad working in Gulf. His family members meet Archana and her family. Everything seems to fall in place as the engagement and subsequent marriage is fixed. Things seem to go in the right track, when just before the day of the marriage, Archana receives a call from Prasad's brother in law informing her that Prasad has eloped with a girl. With the marriage not happening , a lot of emotions go through Archana's mind. She does not reveal on Prasad eloping and the marriage stands cancelled to anyone. On the day of marriage, the ceremony goes as per the plan, but Archana reveals to her guests about Prasad's betrayal and says boldly that its not a time to cry, but be happy that the marriage with a treacherous person did not happen. The guests understand her and everyone celebrates with Archana. In the end its shown that Archana has decided to take her life in her own hands rather than worry about the society.

Cast

Release
The film was released on 11 February 2022.

Reception
The film met with mostly mixed reviews. The Times of India gave 3/5 and wrote "A movie that would have worked best as a short-film". Ottplay gave 3/5 and wrote "Aishwarya Lekshmi, interesting climax elevate this simple but sluggish tale". The News Minute gave 2.5/5 and wrote "This Aishwarya Lekshmi film starts smoothly, slips midway". Behindwoods gave 2.25/5 and wrote "Archana 31 Not Out is a good story bogged down by the less-engaging screenplay". The Indian Express wrote "Aishwarya Lekshmi shines in tiring watch".

References

2020s Malayalam-language films
2022 comedy-drama films
Indian comedy-drama films
Films shot in Palakkad